Clemente is both an Italian, Spanish and Portuguese surname and a given name. Notable people with the surname include:

Surname
 Aldo Di Clemente (born 1948), Italian amateur astronomer
 Anna Clemente (born 1994), Italian racewalker
 Ari Clemente (born 1939), Brazilian footballer
 Aria Clemente (born 1995), Filipina actress and singer
 Art Clemente (born 1925), American politician
 C. Daniel Clemente (born 1936), American attorney and businessman
 Christofer Clemente, Australian scientist
 Denis Clemente (born 1986), Puerto Rican basketball player
 Edgard Clemente (born 1975), Puerto Rican baseball player, nephew of Roberto Clemente
 Fernando Clemente (1917–1998), Italian architect
 Francesco Clemente (born 1952), Italian painter
 Gerardo Clemente (born 1982), Swiss football player
 Jacob Clemente (born 1997), American actor and dancer
 Javier Clemente (born 1950), Spanish football manager
 Jim Clemente, American author and television writer and producer
 John Clemente (1926–2011) Italian physician and philatelist
 Joseph Clemente (born 1987), Indian footballer
 L. Gary Clemente (1908–1968), United States Representative from New York
 Louie Clemente (born 1965), American musician
 Ludovic Clemente (born 1986), Andorran footballer
 Manuel Clemente (born 1948), Catholic Patriarch of Lisbon
 Mariano Clemente, Argentine footballer
 Michael Clemente (1908–1987), American mobster
 Nicholas Clemente (1929–2009), American judge
 Paul Clemente, American politician
 Paulo Clemente (born 1983), Portuguese footballer
 Pia Clemente, Filipina-American film producer
 Ramón Clemente (born 1985), Puerto Rican basketball player
 Ramon di Clemente (born 1975), South African Olympic rower
 Roberto Clemente (1934–1972), Puerto Rican baseball player
 Roberto Clemente Jr. (born 1965), Puerto Rican broadcaster and former baseball player, son of Roberto Clemente
 Rosa Clemente (born 1972), American journalist and activist
 Simón de Roxas Clemente y Rubio (1777–1827), a Spanish botanist who used the standard author abbreviation Clemente
 Steve Clemente (1885–1950), Mexican-American actor
 Tim Clemente (born 1960), American counter-terrorism expert
 Valerie Clemente (born 1977), my mom
 Enrique Clemente (born 1999), Spanish footballer

Given name
 Clemente Agosto (born 1974), Puerto Rican politician
 Clemente Aguirre (1828–1900), Mexican musician
 Clemente Albèri (1803–1864), Italian painter
 Clemente Álvarez (born 1968), Venezuelan baseball player
 Clemente Biondetti (1898–1955), Italian racing driver
 Clemente Bocciardo (1620–1658), Italian painter
 Clemente Bondi (1742–1821), Italian poet
 Clemente Canepari (1886–1966), Italian cyclist
 Clemente "Clem" Cattini (born 1937), British musician
 Clemente Cerdeira Fernández (1887–1947), Spanish Arabist and diplomat
 Clemente de Faria Jr. (born 1987), Brazilian racing driver
 Clemente Domínguez y Gómez (1946–2005), Antipope of the Palmarian Catholic Church
 Clemente Estable (1894–1976), Uruguayan scientist
 Clemente Fernández López (1919–1996), Spanish footballer
 Clemente Fracassi (1917–1993), Italian film producer, director and writer
 Clemente G. Gomez-Rodriguez (born 1939), Cuban writer
 Clemente Gera (died 1643), Italian Roman Catholic bishop
 Clemente Gordon (born 1967), American football quarterback
 Clemente Gràcia (1897–1981), Spanish footballer
 Clemente Isnard (1917–2011), Brazilian Catholic bishop
 Clemente López de Osornio (1720–1783), Argentine-Spanish military leader.
 Clemente Marroquín (1897–1978), Guatemalan journalist and politician
 Clemente Mejía (1928–1978), Mexican swimmer
 Clemente Micara (1879–1965), Italian Catholic cardinal
 Clemente Núñez (born 1975), Dominican baseball player
 Clemente Origo (1855–1921), Italian painter
 Clemente Ovalle (born 1982), Mexican footballer
 Clemente Palacios (born 1993), Colombian footballer
 Clemente Palma (1872–1946), Peruvian writer
 Clemente Peani (1731–1782), Catholic missionary
 Clemente Polito (died 1606), Italian Catholic bishop
 Clemente Promontorio (1340–1415), Genoese doge
 Clemente Rebora (1885–1957), Italian poet
 Clemente Rojas (born 1952), Colombian boxer
 Clemente Ruiz Nazario (1896–1969), Puerto Rican judge
 Clemente Russo (born 1982), Italian boxer
 Clemente Sánchez (1947–1978), Mexican boxer
 Clemente Sánchez (born 1958), American politician
 Clemente Soto Vélez (1903–1993), Puerto Rican writer and activist
 Clemente Susini (1754–1814), Italian artist and anatomist
 Clemente Tabone ( 1575–1665), Maltese landowner and militia member
 Clemente Valencia (1968–2011), Mexican wrestler
 Clemente Villaverde (born 1959), Spanish footballer
 Clemente Yerovi (1904–1981), Ecuadoran politician

See also
 Clement (disambiguation)
 Roberto Clemente Community Academy
 Roberto Clemente Award
 San Clemente (disambiguation)

Spanish masculine given names
Italian-language surnames
Spanish-language surnames
Portuguese-language surnames